This is the discography of British multi-instrumentalist Hank Marvin as a solo artist. For information about works with the Shadows, see The Shadows discography and with Marvin, Welch & Farrar, see .

Albums

Studio albums

Live albums

Compilation albums

Video albums

Singles

Notes

References

Discographies of British artists
Rock music discographies